Payushchie Trusy (Ukrainian: Пающіє труси; Singing Panties, Singing Underpants) is a Ukrainian girl group. The band was formed by Ukrainian music producer Andriy Kuzmenko (more known as Kuzma) in 2008, and consists of Iryna Skrinnyk and Olena Slysarenko. Payushchie Trusy came to international attention after taking part in New Wave Festival in July 2010 with the song "Plastic Surgeon", for which they received a Special Prize. Media describes the band as a "sensation in the world of show business, glamour and fashion", while the members themselves describe their music as a "caustic parody at the contemporary pop music".

The Russian term "singing panties" is a popular sarcastic reference to the proliferating scantily-clad girl groups with poor vocal abilities and undemanding lyrics in late Soviet and the subsequent post-Soviet pop music scene.

Band members

Discography

Album 
 2009 — Popsa

Singles

Awards and nominations

References

External links 
 Official Website
 Payushchie Trusy at the Last.fm

Musical groups established in 2008
Ukrainian girl groups
Ukrainian musical groups
Parody musicians
Ukrainian parodists